Hy Eisman (born March 27, 1927) is an American cartoonist.

Comic strips
He entered the comic strip field in 1950 and worked on several strips, including Kerry Drake, Little Iodine and Bunny. In comic books he was the last artist doing Little Lulu before it was cancelled in 1984. 

From 1986 until 2006 (when the strip went into reruns), he wrote and drew  The Katzenjammer Kids.  An interview with Eisman on his career appeared in Hogan's Alley #15 (2007).

From 1994 until 2022, he wrote and drew the Sunday strips for Popeye.  In December 2008, Eisman introduced the character of Bluto to the Popeye Sunday strips, as the twin brother of Brutus.

Personal life 
In September, 1976 Eisman, who lives in Glen Rock, New Jersey, became a teacher at the Joe Kubert School of Cartoon and Graphic Art where he taught until May, 2019. 

He has two daughters by his first marriage. His wife of 42 years died of cancer in the fall of 1997. On June 27, 2004, he married Florenz Greenberg, whose husband had also died in 1997. She was the managing editor at CavanKerry Press, a nonprofit publisher of literary works in Fort Lee, New Jersey. Their wedding invitation was a comic strip with Popeye and Olive Oyl.  Florenz Greenberg died on October 20, 2013, in Glen Rock.

Awards
Eisman won the 1975 National Cartoonists Society's Award for Best Humor Comic Book Cartoonist (for Gold Key's Nancy comic books). In 1983, he received a National Cartoonists Society Award for his work on the Little Lulu comic book.

References

External links
 Glyph: Hy Eisman interview
 Scoop: Hy Eisman interview
 Lambiek
 King Features biography
 NCS Awards
 Squirek, Mark. "Hy Eisman and His Adventures in the National Cartoonists Society", "Daryl Cagle's Political Cartoonist Index", n.d. .
 Archive of McQuarrie, Jim, "Daryl Cagle's Political Cartoonist Index", n.d. WebCitation archive.
 Archive of McQuarrie, Jim, "Oddball Comics" (column), #1154, April 29, 2007

1927 births
American comic strip cartoonists
American comics artists
Living people
Jewish American artists
Popeye